The Color Marketing Group (CMG) is an international association for color design professionals which identifies the direction of color and design trends and translates them into salable colors for manufactured products.

Composed of nearly 1,000 members in 20 countries, CMG forecasts color trends from one to three years in advance for color-related products and services. These products and services include: Action/Recreation, Consumer Goods, Technology, Home, Visual Communications, Transportation, Juvenile Products, Fashion, and environments for Office, Health Care, Retail, Hospitality/Entertainment and Institutional/Public Spaces

Color conferences
On average, 400 members gather at CMG's semi-annual Conferences, to work with fellow professionals on producing a Color Mandate. Each Conference is a global forum for the exchange of non-competitive information on all phases of color marketing.

Workshops held at CMG Conference mandate trends and their influences on design and color. These "influences" run the gamut from social issues to politics, the environment, the economy and cultural diversity. Colors are inter-industry related. As such, one industry influences another, causing color to be dynamic.

While the end result of each semi-annual Conference is the development of a Color Forecast, a key part of these Conferences is the exchange and sharing of information that takes place among members. Knowing what forces and factors are influencing shifts in color directions, as seen through the eyes of their CMG colleagues, is as important to the Color Designer as the Forecast itself.

Other color organizations

Color forecasting trade associations
 The Color Marketing Group (CMG)
 The Color Association of the United States (CAUS)
 The International Colour Authority (ICA)

Color matching/management organizations
 Pantone
 International Color Consortium (ICC)
 International Commission on Illumination

See also
 Graphic design
 Interior design
 Textiles

External links
 Color Marketing Group
 The Color Association of the United States official site
 International Color Consortium official site
 Sensational Color
 Pantone official site

References
 Color Marketing Group

Color organizations
Companies established in 1981
1981 establishments in the United States